Aleuron is a genus of moths in the family Sphingidae first described by Jean Baptiste Boisduval in 1870.

Species
Aleuron carinata (Walker 1856)
Aleuron chloroptera (Perty 1833)
Aleuron cymographum Rothschild & Jordan 1903
Aleuron iphis (Walker 1856)
Aleuron neglectum Rothschild & Jordan 1903
Aleuron prominens (Walker 1856)
Aleuron ypanemae (Boisduval 1875)

References

 
Dilophonotini
Moth genera
Taxa named by Jean Baptiste Boisduval